Electric Vehicle Company was an American automobile holding company and early pioneering manufacturer of automobiles.

History 
The Electric Vehicle Company was founded September 27, 1897 as a holding company of battery-powered electric vehicle manufacturers made up of several companies assembled by Isaac Rice. Rice had acquired  in May, 1897 another electric cab manufacturer, the Electric Carriage & Wagon Company (E.C.W.C.) in New York. Their vehicles were constructed by Henry G. Morris and Pedro G. Salom, builders of the Electrobats, the first truly useful electric automobiles in the USA. E.V.W.C. pioneered a cab system that included service stations for quick change of battery sets, and repair work; vehicles were leased only, not sold. Twelve of these cabs were in use in Manhattan in January, 1897. After the merger, E.V.C. concentrated on building heavy but reliable electric cabs which were built in the E.C.W.C. workshops. The rental system was for a short time run by E.V.C. Between 1897 and 1899, there were several hundred E.V.C. vehicles built.

The company was taken over in 1899 by a syndicate around William C. Whitney, Thomas Fortune Ryan Anthony N. Brady, and P. A. B. Widener, thus forming the so-called "Lead Cab Trust," which hoped to develop a monopoly by placing electric cabs on the streets of major American cities, starting with  New York City, Philadelphia, Chicago, Washington, D.C., and Boston. Although by 1899,  E.V.C. was the largest motor car manufacturer in the United States - a position lost to Oldsmobile in 1901 - this policy failed soon, as it was even then not able to sell as many vehicles as necessary for the task. The firm actually made and sold about two thousand electric cars, but fell into hard times in 1900 after facing competition from gas-powered (that is, petroleum fuelled) cars and legal problems stemming from these monopolistic practices, as well as scandal surrounding the poor performance of its vehicles. Whitney brought in industrial leader Albert Augustus Pope now, who brought the Columbia Automobile Company. The trust was reorganized as the parent company of several vehicle manufacturers, among them Columbia and the Riker Electric Vehicle Company, which was acquired in 1902. Electric Vehicle's chief asset was now the holding of the Selden Patent which established a right to royalties from all manufacturers of internal combustion engine vehicles. While this was initially lucrative, it led inevitably to opposition from the other manufacturers and expensive lawsuits, which ended with bankruptcy in 1907. The patent was valid until 1913, but lost its worth as the appellation court reduced it to vehicles with Brayton engines, of which none was used in a motor vehicle.

See also 
 Columbia Automobile Company
 Electric Vehicle
 List of defunct United States automobile manufacturers

Notes

References 
 David A. Kirsch: The Electric Vehicle and the Burden of History. Rutgers University Press, New Brunswick NJ/ London 2000,  
 Ernest Henry Wakefield: History of the Electric Automobile; Battery-Only Powered Cars. edited by SAE (Society of Automotive Engineers). Warrendale PA 1970, 
 
 
 James J. Flink: America Adopts the Automobile - 1895–1910. Massachusetts Institute of Technology, 1970, 
 James J. Flink, The Automobile Age (Cambridge: MIT Press, 1988).
 G. N. Georgano (editor): Complete Encyclopedia of Motorcars, 1885 to the Present. 2nd edition. Dutton Press, New York 1973,

External links 
 The Selden Motor Wagon Photos of the vehicle, plus articles about the gestation of the patent and the lengthy lawsuit which followed
 secondchancegarage.com: The Columbia Car: Reliable, Simple to Operate and Ready for Action - Page 3: To The Electric Vehicle Trust (retrieved, 7 August 2014)
 The Automobile of 1904; Frank Leslie's Popular Monthly (January 1904), Americana Review, 725 Dongan Ave., Scotia NY (USA); published, 1904, deckt auch Importe ab (English)
 Encyclopædia Britannica: Hiram Percy Maxim (English) (retrieved, 7 August 2014)
 kcstudio.com: A.L. Riker - The early story in brief as it directly relates to the history of the Pope Manufacturing Company, the Electric Vehicle Company, and the Columbia cars (English) (retrieved, 4 January 2016)
 kcstudio.com: Charging up the electric cabs; Zeitungsberichte 1896–1898 (English) (retrieved, 4 January 2016)

Vehicle manufacturing companies established in 1897
Vehicle manufacturing companies disestablished in 1907
1897 establishments in New York City
1907 disestablishments in New York (state)
Electric vehicle manufacturers of the United States
Defunct motor vehicle manufacturers of the United States
Patent monetization companies of the United States
Motor vehicle manufacturers based in New York (state)
Defunct manufacturing companies based in New York City